Richard Jennings may refer to:

 Richard Jennings (politician) (c. 1619–1668), English parliamentarian
 Richard E. Jennings (1921–1997), English comic book artist
Richard Slater Jennings (1922-2005), American artist and journalist
 Rick Jennings (born 1953), American football player